XM Classics was a XM Satellite Radio Commercial-Free network that specialized in playing traditional classical music. It was available on channel 110 on XM and channel 864 on DirecTV. The program director for XM Classics was Martin Goldsmith (previously the longtime host of the public radio series Performance Today).

In November 2008, following XM's merger with rival satellite radio provider Sirius, XM Classics was replaced with Sirius's Symphony Hall channel.

Programming
 Exploring Music
 Millennium of Music
 Detroit Symphony Orchestra
 Steinway's Black and White Blockbusters
 The New York Philharmonic This Week

Defunct radio stations in the United States
Radio stations established in 2001
Radio stations disestablished in 2008